Coral Sun Airways is the younger of two Kiribati airlines (after flag carrier Air Kiribati), established in January 2009. The airline operated domestic service to all 17 airports in the Gilbert Islands, but stopped any regular service and offers only on-demand and chartered flights. In 2015 it purchased one new, larger aircraft, capable of flying to the Phoenix Islands and Line Islands. There was no domestic nor international service to these remote archipelagos to the east of the Gilbert Islands, having 8,800 and 20 inhabitants, respectively, except for one weekly flight on Fiji Airways between Honolulu and Kiritimati (Christmas) Island among the Line Islands, and Air Kiribati domestic flights between the Line Islands.

In January 2015, Coral Sun Airways announced their intentions to provide charter services between Kiribati and Samoa. The service will operate by way of a stop at Funafuti Airport in Tuvalu and so provide for a connection from Tuvalu to both Western Samoa and to Kiribati direct. 
Other routes being evaluated include New Caledonia, Tonga, Solomon Islands, Fiji and the Northern Cook Islands.

The aircraft will be a Beechcraft King Air 200 which is a pressurized aircraft with a configuration of up to 8 passenger seats, and was purchased by Coral Sun Airways in 2014. The King Air is a multi engine turbo prop which cruises at jet levels and has been one of the most popular aircraft of all time. It is the primary aircraft used by Australia's Royal Flying Doctor Service.
The King Air also comes equipped with facilities to convert the aircraft into Aeromedical Evacuation configuration. In mid-2019 Coral Sun purchased its first IAI Westwind Jet with another option for two more will enter service in late October 2019.

Domestic Destinations 
No regular service since 2018:
Gilbert Islands
 Abaiang – Abaiang Airport
 Abemama – Abemama Airport
 Aranuka – Aranuka Airport
 Arorae – Arorae Airport
 Beru – Beru Airport
 Butaritari – Butaritari Airport
 Kuria – Kuria Airport
 Maiana – Maiana Airport
 Makin – Makin Airport
 Marakei – Marakei Airport
 Nikunau – Nikunau Airport
 Nonouti – Nonouti Airport
 Onotoa – Onotoa Airport
 Tabiteuea North – Tabiteuea North Airport
 Tabiteuea South – Tabiteuea South Airport
 Tamana – Tamana Airport
 Tarawa – Bonriki International Airport Hub
Phoenix Islands and Line Islands
 Kanton Island – Canton Island Airport
 Kiritimati (aka Christmas Island) – Cassidy International Airport

International Destinations 

Solomon Islands
 Honiara – Honiara International Airport
Marshall Islands
 Majuro – Majuro International Airport
Fiji Islands
 Suva – Nausori Airport
 Nadi – Nadi International Airport
Australia
 Cairns – Cairns International Airport

Fleet 

As of 2015 Coral Sun Airways owns the following fleet of aircraft:

1 Beechcraft King Air 200 
1 Piper Aztec F Model
3 IAI Westwind

External links
 Official website

Airlines of Kiribati
Airlines established in 2009
2009 establishments in Oceania